The canton of Sarralbe is an administrative division of the Moselle department, northeastern France. Its borders were modified at the French canton reorganisation which came into effect in March 2015. Its seat is in Sarralbe.

It consists of the following communes:
 
Altrippe
Baronville
Bérig-Vintrange
Biding
Bistroff
Boustroff
Brulange
Destry
Diffembach-lès-Hellimer
Eincheville
Ernestviller
Erstroff
Frémestroff
Freybouse
Gréning
Grostenquin
Grundviller
Guebenhouse
Guessling-Hémering
Harprich
Hazembourg
Hellimer
Hilsprich
Holving
Kappelkinger
Kirviller
Landroff
Laning
Lelling
Leyviller
Lixing-lès-Saint-Avold
Loupershouse
Maxstadt
Morhange
Nelling
Petit-Tenquin
Puttelange-aux-Lacs
Racrange
Rémering-lès-Puttelange
Richeling
Saint-Jean-Rohrbach
Sarralbe
Suisse
Vahl-Ebersing
Le Val-de-Guéblange
Vallerange
Viller
Woustviller

References

Cantons of Moselle (department)